Kuźniczka may refer to the following places:
Kuźniczka, Greater Poland Voivodeship (west-central Poland)
Kuźniczka, Opole Voivodeship (south-west Poland)
Kuźniczka, Silesian Voivodeship (south Poland)